The 2022 Crayon 200 was the 18th stock car race of the 2022 NASCAR Xfinity Series, and the 32nd iteration of the event. The race was held on Saturday, July 16, 2022, in Loudon, New Hampshire at New Hampshire Motor Speedway, a  permanent oval-shaped racetrack. The race took the scheduled 200 laps to complete. At race's end, Justin Allgaier, driving for JR Motorsports, took the lead late in the race, and earned his 19th career NASCAR Xfinity Series win, along with his third of the season. To fill out the podium, Trevor Bayne, driving for Joe Gibbs Racing, and Brandon Brown, driving for his family team, Brandonbilt Motorsports, would finish in 2nd and 3rd, respectively. Landon Cassill and Noah Gragson initially finished 3rd and 4th, but were both disqualified after the race, as both of their cars were too low to the ground.

This was the debut race for the NASCAR Whelen Euro Series driver, and the former contestant on the 26th season of the CBS reality show, Survivor, Julia Landauer.

Background 
New Hampshire Motor Speedway is a  oval speedway located in Loudon, New Hampshire, which has hosted NASCAR racing annually since 1990, as well as the longest-running motorcycle race in North America, the Loudon Classic. Nicknamed "The Magic Mile", the speedway is often converted into a  road course, which includes much of the oval.

The track was originally the site of Bryar Motorsports Park before being purchased and redeveloped by Bob Bahre. The track is currently one of eight major NASCAR tracks owned and operated by Speedway Motorsports.

Entry list

Practice 
The only 30-minute practice session was held on Friday, July 15, at 5:00 PM EST.

Qualifying 
Qualifying was held on Friday, July 15, at 5:30 PM EST. Since New Hampshire Motor Speedway is an oval track, the qualifying system used is a single-car, single-lap system with only one round. Whoever sets the fastest time in the round wins the pole. 

Race results 
Stage 1 Laps: 45

Stage 2 Laps: 45

Stage 3 Laps: 110

Standings after the race 

Drivers' Championship standings

Note: Only the first 12 positions are included for the driver standings.

Notes

References 

2022 NASCAR Xfinity Series
NASCAR races at New Hampshire Motor Speedway
Crayon 200
2022 in sports in New Hampshire